Epicyme is a monotypic moth genus in the family Geometridae described by Edward Meyrick in 1885. Its only species, Epicyme rubropunctaria, the red-spotted delicate, described by Edward Doubleday in 1843, is found in New Zealand, the Australian Capital Territory, Tasmania and Victoria.

The wingspan is about 25 mm.

The larvae have been recorded feeding on plants in the genera Haloragis, Gaultheria and Geranium.

References

External links

Australian Faunal Directory

Moths described in 1843
Moths of Australia
Asthenini
Moths of New Zealand
Monotypic moth genera